Crosscurrent is a 2016 Chinese drama film directed by Yang Chao. It was selected to compete for the Golden Bear at the 66th Berlin International Film Festival. At Berlin Mark Lee Ping-Bing won the Silver Bear for Outstanding Artistic Contribution for Cinematography.

Cast
 Qin Hao
 Xin Zhilei
 Wu Lipeng
 Wang Hongwei
 Jiang Hualin

Plot 
Captain Gao Chun (Qin Hao) continues to go ashore to find an affair during the time he pilots a cargo ship along the Yangtze River. But he gradually discovers that the women he meets at different docks seems to be the same person-Anlu (Xin Zhilei). Just as the voyage goes up, Anlu is gentle and sometimes crazy, but she is getting younger and younger. Gao Chun falls in love with Anlu, stops the boat to meet her, and gradually finds that the location of Anlu is related to a handwritten poem of an unknown author. However, after the ship passes the Three Gorges, Anlu no longer appears. Gao Chun frantically searches for Anlu, and finds the secret of Anlu in the poetry and route maps. There is a change on the ship, but he still desperately drives the cargo ship alone and continues to trace the Yangtze River until he reaches the source of the snowy mountain. Finally, he finds the origin of Anlu and the secret of the Yangtze River.

Reception
Maggie Lee of Variety called the film a "gorgeously shot meditation on the Yangtze River [that] all but drowns in pretentious symbolism and philosophical musings." Deborah Young of The Hollywood Reporter said of the film: "Beautiful romanticism in search of a narrative shore." Lee Marshall of Screen Daily called the film "a meandering, sluggish tale that offers moments of great beauty but ultimately feels like a ragbag, take-your-pick bundle of poetic and spiritual suggestions inspired by China’s great Yangtze River."

References

External links
 

2016 films
2016 drama films
Chinese drama films
2010s Mandarin-language films
Silver Bear for outstanding artistic contribution